The 1997 FIA GT Donington 4 Hours  was the eighth race of the 1997 FIA GT Championship season.  It was run at Donington Park, England on September 14, 1997.

Official results
Class winners in bold.  Cars failing to complete 75% of winner's distance marked as Not Classified (NC).

Statistics
 Pole Position – #11 AMG-Mercedes – 1:23.854
 Fastest Lap – #11 AMG-Mercedes – 1:26.075
 Distance – 639.177 km
 Average Speed – 159.776 km/h

External links

 World Sports Prototype Racing – Race Results

D
Donington 4 Hours